Alley Oop is a syndicated comic strip created December 5, 1932, by American cartoonist V. T. Hamlin, who wrote and drew the strip through four decades for Newspaper Enterprise Association. Hamlin introduced a cast of colorful characters and his storylines entertained with a combination of adventure, fantasy, and humor. Alley Oop, the strip's title character, is a sturdy citizen in the prehistoric kingdom of Moo. He rides his pet dinosaur Dinny, carries a stone axe, and wears only a fur loincloth.

Alley Oop's name was most likely derived from the French phrase allez, hop! In the 1933 press release that accompanied the launching of the strip with its new distributor NEA, Hamlin was quoted as saying "I really can't recall just how I struck upon the name 'Alley Oop', although it might be from the fact that the name is a French term used by tumblers. Alley Oop really is a roughhouse tumbler." The name of Alley's girlfriend, Ooola, was a play on a different French phrase, oh là là.

Story
The first stories took place in the fictional "Bone Age" (similar to the Stone Age) and centered on Alley Oop's dealings with his fellow cavemen in the kingdom of Moo. Oop and his pals had occasional skirmishes with the rival kingdom of Lem, ruled by King Tunk. The names Moo and Lem are references to the fabled lost continents of Mu and Lemuria.

On April 5, 1939, Hamlin introduced a new plot device which greatly expanded his choice of storylines: A time machine was invented by 20th-century scientist Dr. Elbert Wonmug; the name Wonmug was a pun on Albert Einstein, as "ein" is German for "one" and a "stein" is a type of drinking mug.

Oop was transported to the 20th century by an early test of the machine (in the daily strip of April 8 and the Sunday strip of April 9, 1939). He became Dr. Wonmug's man in the field, embarking on expeditions to various periods in history, such as Ancient Egypt, the England of Robin Hood, and the American frontier. Oop met historical or mythical figures such as Cleopatra, King Arthur, and Ulysses in his adventures. In addition to the time machine, other science-fiction devices were introduced. Oop once drove an experimental electric-powered race car, and he has space-traveled to Venus, the moon (twice), and "Earth-Two". During his adventures, he was often accompanied by his girlfriend Ooola and by the sometimes-villainous, sometimes-heroic George Oscar Boom (G. O. Boom). Laboratory assistant Ava Peckedge joined the cast in 1986.

Syndication history

Alley Oop was first distributed by the small syndicate Bonnet-Brown on December 5, 1932, but this run ended on April 26, 1933 when Bonnet-Brown became defunct. NEA picked up the strip and, starting on August 7, 1933, the earlier material was reworked for a larger readership. A full-page Sunday strip was added on September 9, 1934; the strip also appeared in half-page, tabloid, and half-tab formats, which were smaller and/or dropped panels. During World War II, newspapers eliminated full-page comics to save paper; starting on December 1, 1940, Alley Oop's Sunday comic was offered in a smaller format which could, at an editor's discretion, be further reconfigured to save space. Daily comics were first reduced in size on April 20, 1942, and have become smaller since then, but they have been appearing in color since September 15, 2008.

When Hamlin retired in 1971, his assistant Dave Graue took over. Graue had been assisting Hamlin since 1950 (starting as a letterer) and creating the daily solo since July 15, 1966, although co-signed by Hamlin. Hamlin's last signed daily strip appeared December 31, 1972, and his last signed Sunday was April 1, 1973. Through the 1970s and 1980s, Graue wrote and drew the strip from his North Carolina studio. On December 30, 1991, Jack Bender took on the finishing art chores of the strip; that is, Graue wrote and pencilled each strip, after which Bender inked and lettered it (and colored it, for Sunday strips). Starting September 3, 2001, Alley Oop Sunday and daily strips were drawn entirely by Jack Bender and written by his wife Carole Bender. (On December 10, 2001, the 75-year-old Graue was killed in Flat Rock, North Carolina, when a dump truck hit his car.) In January 2019, writer Joey Alison Sayers and artist Jonathan Lemon took over the comic.

At its peak, Alley Oop was carried by 800 newspapers. Today, it appears in more than 600 newspapers. The strip and collections of it were popular in Mexico (under the name Trucutú) and in Brazil (Brucutu). In 1995, Alley Oop was one of 20 strips showcased in the Comic Strip Classics series of commemorative United States postage stamps.

Licensing and promotion
In 1978, Alley Oop was adapted to animation as a segment of Filmation's Saturday morning cartoon series Fabulous Funnies, appearing intermittently alongside other comic-strip favorites: The Captain and the Kids, Broom-Hilda, Emmy Lou, Tumbleweeds, and Nancy.

In 2002, Dark Horse Comics produced a limited-edition figure of the character in a brightly illustrated tin container. Alley Oop was issued as statue #28 — part of their line of Classic Comic Characters collectibles.

In 2008, to celebrate Alley Oop's 75th year, the Benders conducted a contest for "Dinosaur Drawings from Our Young Readers". The entry Tyrannosaurus rex holding a banner wishing "Happy Birthday" to Alley Oop, by 12 year-old Erin Holloway of Hammond, Louisiana, was published in the comic strip on January 17, 2009.

In popular culture
The long-running success of the strip made the character a pop culture icon referred to in fiction, pop music and dance:
 The Belgian comic-strip series Suske en Wiske, by Willy Vandersteen, features a caveman inspired by Alley Oop.
An educated Neanderthal known as "Alley Oop" is a character in Clifford D. Simak's science-fiction novel The Goblin Reservation, published in 1968.
"O. Paley" (whose name was a loose anagram of "Alley Oop") was the central figure in Philip José Farmer's The Alley Man, a 1959 novella about the last Neanderthal who has survived into the 20th century.
The character was the subject of the 1960 number-one single "Alley Oop", which was the only hit for the short-lived studio band The Hollywood Argyles. It was written and composed in 1957 by Dallas Frazier. Musicians on the record included Kim Fowley and Sandy Nelson. The song was later covered, most famously by the Bonzo Dog Doo-Dah Band but also by Dante & the Evergreens, The Royal Guardsmen, Sha-Na-Na, The Beach Boys and George Thorogood & the Destroyers, and it was included in choreographer Twyla Tharp's 1970s ballet Deuce Coupe.
 Alley Oop is mentioned in the 1971 David Bowie song Life on Mars.
There is an Alley Oop museum and fantasy land theme park in Iraan, Texas

Main characters
A main character is one who is a fixture of a particular setting. For example, King Guz and Queen Umpa are always present in ancient Moo, even if they are not central to every storyline.

Although Ooola is "Alley Oop's girlfriend", and their jealousy of potential rivals has driven many storylines, they rarely showed each other affection prior to the Benders' run. (More often, Ooola did serious violence to Alley's cranium.) For the first 69 years of the strip's existence, the two kissed only twice: once on August 14, 1945, as a last goodbye when they believed they were going to be drowned, and again on September 28, 1999 when Ooola pecked Alley on the cheek as thank-you for a timely rescue. The Benders made the couple more physically affectionate and even brought them to the altar—but, when they reached that point, Alley and Ooola decided that they made better friends than spouses.

Doctor Wonmug was drawn to look identical to the Grand Wizer. By the end of Dave Graue's tenure, Wonmug and the Wizer had been in each other's company five times; in each instance, the story was told as though the two characters had never met before, and the characters' identical appearances were remarked upon (May 26, 1945; December 7, 1960; July 17, 1963; July 30, 1965; September 24, 1970). The Benders addressed the similarity twice (on October 6, 2006 and March 23, 2007) by subverting it; that is, the other characters exclaimed that the two looked the same, but both the Wizer and Wonmug scoffed and claimed not to see any resemblance. In the daily strip on June 21, 1969, Wonmug's birthdate is given as May 10, 1900 (which was also V.T. Hamlin's birthday).

Dinny, Alley Oop's pet dinosaur, was designed as an amalgam of different features and was not meant to resemble any known dinosaur. Dinny's species is identified as a "Cartoonosaurus" in the daily strip on April 12, 1968.

Supporting characters
New stories typically introduced new characters, especially when those stories were set outside of Moo. Therefore, a "supporting character" is one who has been featured across multiple storylines.

Eeny, the dictator, was a transparent representation of Hitler. In her first story, in 1937, she recruited "hairshirts", taught them a familiar arm-raised salute, and installed herself as "dictator" while leaving Queen Umpa as a figurehead ruler. In her second story, in 1942, she and her "Moozys", headed by the armbanded "Moostapo", overran the country and herded its citizens into "concentration caves."

The Lemian King was inconsistent during Hamlin's run. King Tunk first appeared in 1934 as a bald man with a stubbled chin, and he remained so through 1938. In 1944, this same character was named Wur rather than Tunk, although Sawalla's King Wur had previously been featured in storylines alongside King Tunk. When Lem was re-introduced in 1954, its king was named Tunk but was clean-shaven and had a full head of hair; the Lemian king returned to his original design in 1959 but was again called Wur. He regained the name Tunk in 1961 (giving his full name as "Clab Tunk" on May 22, 1961) and from then on it stuck.

Dave Wowee, Wonmug's great-great-great-grandson, was named in honor of (and drawn to resemble) Dave Graue, who typically told people that his last name "rhymes with Wowee".

Collections and reprints

Books
{| class="wikitable mw-collapsible mw-collapsed"
|-
! Title !! Publication Year !! Publisher !! Dates reprinted
|-
| Alley Oop: The Sawalla Chronicles || 1983 || Ken Pierce Inc. || April 10 – August 28, 1936 (a few strips omitted)
|-
| Alley Oop by Dave Graue || 1983 || TOR Publications || May 14, July 6–13, Sept 18–20, November 24 – December 31, 1979; January 1 – February 4, 1980; September 8 – December 1, 1981; April 5–24, April 28 – June 12, 1982
|-
| Alley Oop Volume 1: The Adventures of a Time-Traveling Caveman || 1990 || Kitchen Sink Press || July 20, 1946 – June 20, 1947
|-
| Alley Oop Volume 2: The Sphinx and Alley Oop || 1991 || Kitchen Sink Press || June 21, 1947 – August 30, 1948
|-
| Alley Oop Volume 3: First Trip to the Moon || 1995 || Kitchen Sink Press || August 31, 1948 – November 9, 1949
|-
| Alley Oop: Book 4 || 2003 || Manuscript Press || November 10, 1949 – November 10, 1950
|-
| The Library of American Comics Essentials Volume 4: Alley Oop 1939: The First Time Travel Adventure || 2014 || Idea & Design Works' The Library of American Comics || March 6, 1939 – March 23, 1940
|-
| Alley Oop: The Complete Sundays Volume 1 || 2014 || Dark Horse || September 9, 1934 – December 27, 1936
|-
| Alley Oop: The Complete Sundays Volume 2 || 2014 || Dark Horse || January 3, 1937 – April 30, 1939
|-
| Alley Oop Goes Modern: The Complete Sundays Volume 3 || 2022 || Acoustic Learning || May 7, 1939 – December 28, 1941
|-
| Alley Oop In the Land of Giants: The Complete Sundays 1982–1984  || 2023 || Acoustic Learning || January, 1982 – December 28, 1984
|-
| Alley Oop and Dinny || 2022 || Acoustic Learning || December 5, 1932 – April 26, 1933 (aka Bonnet–Brown #1–120); August 7 – December 31, 1933
|-
| War with Lem || 2022 || Acoustic Learning || January 1 – December 31, 1934
|-
| Invasion of Moo || 2022 || Acoustic Learning || January 1 – December 31, 1935
|-
| Sawalla || 2022 || Acoustic Learning || January 1 – December 31, 1936
|-
| Chief Bighorn || 2022 || Acoustic Learning || January 1 – December 31, 1937
|-
| Mootoo || 2022 || Acoustic Learning || January 1 – December 31, 1938
|-
| Alley Oop and The Dragon of Iron Castle || 2023 || Acoustic Learning || January 1 – December 31, 1954
|-
| Alley Oop and The Tiger Tail Transplant || 2023 || Acoustic Learning || January 1 – December 31, 1955
|-
| Alley Oop Races Blarney Goldfield || 2023 || Acoustic Learning || January 1 – December 31, 1956
|-
| Alley Oop On the Mississippi || 2023 || Acoustic Learning || January 1 – December 31, 1957
|-
| Alley Oop: Back to the Moon || 2023 || Acoustic Learning || January 1 – December 31, 1958
|-
| Alley Oop and The Million-Dollar Nugget || 2023 || Acoustic Learning || January 1 – December 31, 1959
|-
| Alley Oop and Han Sin's Kite || 2022 || Acoustic Learning || January 1 – December 31, 1974
|-
| Alley Oop and the Thorn King of Nerr || 2022 || Acoustic Learning || January 1 – December 31, 1975
|-
| Alley Oop and the Hunt for the Texas Pterosaurs || 2022 || Acoustic Learning || January 1 – December 31, 1976
|-
| Alley Oop and the Great Moovian Migration || 2022 || Acoustic Learning || January 1 – December 31, 1977
|-
| Alley Oop on the Planet of Delfon || 2022 || Acoustic Learning || January 1 – December 31, 1978
|-
| Alley Oop In Wonderland || 2022 || Acoustic Learning || January 1 – December 31, 1979
|-
| Alley Oop and The Seven Cities of Gold || 2023 || Acoustic Learning || January 1 – December 31, 1980
|-
| Alley Oop Meets Draculina || 2023 || Acoustic Learning || January 1 – December 31, 1981
|-
| Alley Oop On the Trail of the Swamp Fox || 2023 || Acoustic Learning || January 1 – December 31, 1982
|-
| Alley Oop Versus The Black Knight || 2023 || Acoustic Learning || January 1 – December 31, 1983
|-
| Alley Oop and The First Prehistoric Olympic Games || 2023 || Acoustic Learning || January 1 – December 31, 1984
|-
| Alley Oop and The Captive Prince || 2023 || Acoustic Learning || January 1 – December 31, 1985
|-
|}

Magazines

In addition to the magazines mentioned in the table below, Comics Revue has also reprinted Alley Oop daily and Sunday strips. The Menomonee Falls Guardian, published weekly, reprinted one week of daily strips in each issue.  The Menomonee Falls Guardian Special #1–3 were sold separately; Special #4 was an insert included with issue #100.

Comics
Various strips have also been reprinted in comic-book form. The comic books tended to alter the original reading experience by colorizing the daily strips as well as rearranging, dropping, cropping or extending panels to fit the format. Recap and exposition panels, as well as strips that served as diversions from the perceived "main story" (such as an interlude of Alley and Foozy discovering how to drive a car while Dr. Wonmug fixed the time machine), were typically excised.Famous Funnies and The Funnies re-lettered their Sunday-strip reprints, enlarging the text and simplifying the language, so that the comic would be more legible when reduced from tabloid to comic-book size. Although the first seven issues of Red Ryder Comics' Sunday-strip reprints were unaltered, in every subsequent issue the panels were enlarged, redrawn, rearranged or deleted.

The Antarctic Press series featured a combination of original material, direct reprints of newspaper comics, and redrawn adaptations of newspaper-strip stories.  The reprints rearranged, resized, and sometimes omitted panels. These reprints and adaptations are noted in the list of storylines.

Original publications
The following publications were original material, not newspaper reprints:Alley Oop and Dinny A Big Little Book No. 763 (1935) Whitman PublishingAlley Oop in The Invasion of Moo (1935) (Cocomalt Premium) WhitmanAlley Oop and Dinny in the Jungles of Moo A Big Little Book #1473 (1938) WhitmanAlley Oop and the Missing King of Moo A Penny Book (1938) WhitmanAlley Oop and the Cave Men of Moo (Pan-Am Premium) (1938) WhitmanAlley Oop and the Kingdom of Foo (Pan-Am Premium) (1938) WhitmanAlley Oop: Taming a Dinosaur (Pan-Am Premium) (1938) WhitmanAlley Oop sheet music (1960) Kavelin-Maverick Music (USA), Leeds Music (Australia, New Zealand)Alley Oop Coloring Book (1962) Treasure BooksAlley Oop comic book, issues 1–3 (1963) Dell Publishing Co.Alley Oop Fun Book (1981) Happy House Books

See alsoThe FlintstonesThe Cavern ClanSunday storylines
The following table is a list of storylines featured in the Sunday comic strips. The ending of a storyline frequently overlapped with the beginning of the next, and actual story titles were provided only on a few occasions (e.g., "Alley Oop at Crummystone Manor" or "The Perpetual Motion Machine"). The dates and story descriptions given here are, therefore, not official or definitive delineations but may serve as a rough index to the history of the strip. Most of the Sunday strips from November 1996 onward are available on gocomics.com.

The Sunday strips' continuity ran separately from the daily strips until 2006 (with two exceptions, as noted in the list). In the first few years following the time machine's introduction, Hamlin shifted the setting of the Sunday strip, sometimes abruptly, to match that of the daily storyline, but the Sunday and daily strips were entirely different stories, told in parallel, and they did not overlap. For example, when Oop was first brought to the 20th century, the Sunday storyline showed him doing little more than figuring out modern clothing and calmly running a few errands, whereas the daily strip had him roving all around the countryside in cars, trains, and planes, wreaking havoc and making headlines as the "Phantom Ape". If the same events did occur in both continuities, they were always told differently: before the first time-machine story, for example, Alley Oop acquired the Moovian royal jewels; however, in the Sunday strip, Guz voluntarily installed Alley as king (so he could take a vacation), while in the daily strip Alley took the throne by force (as revenge for Guz stealing and eating Dinny's egg).

After 1961, the Sunday strips featured no time travel but were set exclusively in Moo. It is possible that, from 1961 onward, the Sunday stories were meant to have taken place prior to Alley having met the time-machine crew because, in these strips, Alley was shown to be unaware of concepts he had already encountered in the time-travel storylines, such as shoes, or snow, or even the wheel.

Starting in January 2006, through the Benders' retirement in mid-2019, Sunday strips were not new stories but reprinted panels from the previous week's daily strips.

Since late 2019, the artistic team has made the Sunday strips "Little Oop", portraying a young Alley Oop. Little Oop was first set in a land of Moo that is anachronistic in a way similar to the Flintstones' "modern stone age", but he met a time-traveling child named Penelope who brought him to the modern era (on March 1, 2020).

Topper stripsAlley Oop's Sunday page had different toppers starting with the first strip and running through 1944:Dinny's Family Album, September 9, 1934 – February 7, 1937Foozy's Limericks, February 21 – May 16, 1937Prehistoric Cut-Outs in Modern Dress, May 23 – September 12, 1937Fragments, September 19, 1937 – April 9, 1939Scientists Say, April 16 – July 2, 1939Odds 'n' Ends, July 9, 1939 – April 21, 1940Story of a Dinosaur Egg, April 28 – August 25, 1940Foozy's Foolosophies'', September 1, 1940 – September 5, 1943
The characters argue over who gets to use the space (breaking the fourth wall), September 12, 1943 – January 2, 1944
Buy War Bonds cartoon advertisements, January 9 – August 27, 1944

Sunday strips

1930s

1940s

1950s

1960s

1970s

1980s

1990s

2000s

Daily storylines
The following is a list of storylines featured in the daily comic strips. Actual story titles were not provided in the strips; the dates and story descriptions given here are, therefore, not official or definitive delineations but may serve as a rough index to the history of the strip.

Although the Bonnet–Brown strips appeared in daily comics sections, their distribution was erratic, so that the strips' handwritten dates did not always match their actual publication dates. Consequently, after February 6, 1933, the strips were not dated but were instead given a sequential number (from 55 through 120), presumably so that editors could run them whenever they were received. The dates given here may, therefore, not be precisely accurate for every newspaper in which the strip appeared.

Bonnet–Brown

Newspaper Enterprise Association

1930s

1940s

1950s

1960s

1970s

1980s

1990s

2000s

2010s

2020s

The slug creature in the January 17, 2020 strip is an homage to V.T. Hamlin's Venusian beast from December 30, 1950.

References

Further reading
Caveman: V.T. Hamlin & Alley Oop (2005), an award-winning documentary by Max Allan Collins, narrated by Michael Cornelison and featuring interviews with Will Eisner and Dave Graue, was released on DVD by VCI Home Video in 2008.

External links
1957 Alley Oop sequence
Alley Oop
Caveman: V.T. Hamlin & Alley Oop
Clark J. Holloway on Alley Oop
Alley Oop at Don Markstein's Toonopedia. Archived from the original on April 4, 2012.
University of Missouri: V.T. Hamlin Archives
Alley Oop is a Texan? by C. F. Eckhardt

American comic strips
1932 comics debuts
Fictional prehistoric characters
Prehistoric people in popular culture
Comics set in prehistory
Comics about time travel
Adventure comics
Humor comics
Fantasy comics
American comics characters
Comics adapted into animated series
Male characters in comics